Turner's Choultry is a  Bungalow located in Jagadamba Centre, Visakhapatnam, India.

about
in the year 1893 Construction of Turner's Choultry started  and the total cost of  43,000  of which   10,000 paid by Maharaja of Vizianagram, Pusapati Ananda Gajapati Raju,  10,000 paid by King Goday Narayana Gajapathi Rao and raised by public. 

The 19th century sudden growth of Visakhapatnam City because construction of Railway Station and King George Hospital brought to the large number of people to the city so the Rajah of Bobbili made a propose to construct a building  for people need as a memorial to late H G Turner former district collector Vizagapatam.

References

Buildings and structures in Visakhapatnam